The Rural Municipality of Huron No. 223 is a rural municipality (RM) in the Canadian province of Saskatchewan within Census Division No. 7 and  Division No. 2.

History 
The RM of Huron No. 223 incorporated as a rural municipality on December 12, 1910.

Geography

Communities and localities 
The following urban municipalities are surrounded by the RM.

Villages
Tugaske.

Lakes and rivers 
Qu'Appelle River
Eyebrow Lake

Demographics 

Government 
The RM of Huron No. 223 is governed by an elected municipal council and an appointed administrator that meets on the first Wednesday of every month. The reeve of the RM is Corey Doerksen while its administrator is Daryl Dean. The RM's office is located in Tugaske.

References 

H